Stanmore College is a small college for further education in the London Borough of Harrow. It was established in 1987 as one of the borough's three tertiary colleges, originally called Elm Park College. In 1994 it was renamed to its present name to facilitate closer representation to the local community of Stanmore.

The college was rated 'Good' by Ofsted in 2017 and its self-assessment rated it 'Outstanding' in 2020. Students are recruited locally and beyond including a significant amount from Brent, Barnet and Hertfordshire. 

As of 2017 there were 1,800 learners, of which just under 1,000 were on full-time 16-18 study programmes. It forms part of the Harrow Sixth Form Collegiate.

History
The college started in 1969 as Harrow Junior College, built in a residential area between Elm Park, Old Church Lane and The Ridgeway. It was notably the first purpose-built sixth form college in the country. It was soon renamed Stanmore Junior College and by 1974 became Stanmore Sixth Form College.

Following the borough's restructuring of post-16 education in 1987, Stanmore Sixth Form College was replaced by a new tertiary college named Elm Park College. It was one of three created by Harrow, the others being Greenhill College and Weald College (both later merged into Harrow College). Elm Park College was renamed Stanmore College on 1 January 1994.

In January 2000 the institute became legally divided between Stanmore Sixth Form College and Stanmore Adult College, for sixth form and adult students respectively. The two merged back into one organisation in 2007. At the time, the college self-styled itself as “the Small College for Big Achievers”. Its A-level pass rate was 99.8% that year.

Stanmore College was one of 16 colleges chosen in the country to receive funding through a programme launched by Boris Johnson, meaning the college will undergo refurbishment.

Former Principals
 Mr John Mitchell (1987-1989)
 Mr Russell Woodrow (1989-2006) 
 Mrs Jacqui Mace (2006-2016)
 Mrs Sarbdip Noonan (2016- 2022)
 Mrs Annette Cast (2022-)

Curriculum
The College offers a range of vocational programmes and A levels. It has links with industry.

Recent years have seen Stanmore College operate with a sharpened focus on five areas, namely:

 16- to 18-year-olds
 adults
 workplace learning
 job seekers
 community learners

Facilities
The college has a newly refurbished Learning Resources Centre.

Notable alumni
 Tony McNulty - Politician
 Sushil Wadhwani - Economist
 Taio Cruz - Musician

References

External links
Official Site

Educational institutions established in 1987
Further education colleges in London
Education in the London Borough of Harrow
1987 establishments in England